St. Quintian of Rome (fl. 250) was a Roman confessor who suffered during the Decian persecution.

References

3rd-century Christians